Bangsamoro may refer to:

 Moro people, also known as the Bangsamoros, a group of Muslim people within the ethnic indigenous tribes in Southeast Asia
 Bangsamoro Autonomous Region in Muslim Mindanao (BARMM), an autonomous region within the Philippines for the ethnic Moro
 Bangsamoro Organic Law, the law that established the BARMM
 Bangsamoro Republik, a short-lived breakaway state declared by the Moro National Liberation Front in 2013 
 Bangsamoro Islamic Freedom Fighters, a militant organization based in Mindanao, Philippines